Peterburgskaya Gazeta ("St. Petersburg Gazette") was a Russian political and literary newspaper, launched in 1867 by the publisher Ilya Arsenyev (1820–1888).

Originally a small-scale publication (coming out three times a week), it was bought in 1871 by Sergey Khudekov, started to gain momentum and in 1882 become a popular daily. Among the authors who contributed to it on the regular basis, were Nikolai Leskov, Alexander Kugel, Sergey Terpigorev, Vasily Avseenko, Ieronim Yasinsky, Nikolai Leykin, Dmitry Minayev, Gavriil Zhulev. In all, 33 short stories by Anton Chekhov were published by the St. Petersburg Gazette in 1885–1887, including "The Huntsman", "A Malefactor" and "Sergeant Prishibeyev".

In March 1917 Peterburgskaya Gazeta started to strongly support the Russian Provisional Government, calling for the anti-Bolshevik dictatorship. On 22 November of that year it was closed by the Bolshevist government.

References

External links 
"Peterburgskaya Gazeta" digital archives in "Newspapers on the web and beyond", the digital resource of the National Library of Russia

Newspapers published in the Russian Empire
Newspapers published in Russia
Newspapers established in 1867
Russian-language newspapers
1867 establishments in the Russian Empire
Mass media in Saint Petersburg